Ralph Palmer may refer to:

Ralph Palmer, 12th Baron Lucas (born 1951), British politician
Ralph Palmer Agnew (1900–1986), American mathematician
Ralph Palmer (judge) (1783–1838), British judge
Ralph Charlton Palmer (1839–1923), English barrister
Ralph Judson Palmer (1943–1971), American newspaper publisher